The National Brain Tumor Society (NBTS) is the largest non-profit organization dedicated to the brain tumor community in the United States. It was formed in 2008 by the merger of the National Brain Tumor Foundation and the Brain Tumor Society. Both organizations had been formed in the 1980s by parents and other individuals who wanted to increase both research funding and access to resources specific to brain tumors.

Financial information
In 2009, NBTS gave over $3.5 million in grants to fund brain tumor research across North America.
Eighty-four percent of NBTS's expended resources support NBTS's program initiatives across the U.S.

Fundraising

Events
 Brain Tumor Walk is a fundraising 5K walk and community day to support brain tumor research and patient services at NBTS. Events are organized by volunteers from the brain tumor community with support from NBTS staff. Brain Tumor Walks are currently held locations across the country (San Francisco, Charleston, South Carolina, Charlotte, North Carolina, Denver, Portland, Jacksonville, Florida, San Diego, Boston, Los Angeles, Phoenix, New York City, Long Island, and Dallas-Fort Worth.)
The Boston Brain Tumor Ride (formerly the Ride for Research), a 10-, 25-, 40-, or 62-mile bicycle ride through in Boston's western suburbs, was started in 1995 by the Corkin family. In 2008 and 2009, the ride has raised more than $2 million to support the programs of NBTS.  The name of the ride was changed in 2010, the 16th anniversary of the ride.
The Race for Hope – DC is held annually in Washington, D.C.  This is a 5k fundraising walk/run, presented by Cassidy Turley.
The Race for Hope – PA is held annually in Philadelphia, Pennsylvania, beginning at the steps of the Philadelphia Museum of Art.

References

Cancer charities in the United States
Charities based in Massachusetts
Newton, Massachusetts
Medical and health organizations based in Massachusetts